MW2 may refer to:
Call of Duty: Modern Warfare 2, a 2009 video game
Call of Duty: Modern Warfare II, a 2022 video game
MechWarrior 2: 31st Century Combat, a 1995 video game
Need for Speed: Most Wanted, a 2012 video game, also known as NFS: MW2

See also
 2MW
 MWW (disambiguation)
 "MW-MW", see ISO 3166-2:MW